Several ships of the Swedish Navy have been named HSwMS Stockholm, named after the city of Stockholm:

  was a ship launched in 1682
  was a ship launched in 1708 and sold in 1781
  was a galley launched in 1748
  was a ship of the line launched in 1856 and decommissioned in 1921
  was a  launched in 1936 and decommissioned in 1964
  is a  launched in 1984 and commissioned in 1985

See also
 Stockholm (disambiguation), for other ships

Swedish Navy ship names